The Rising of the Moon is a 1945 mystery detective novel by the British writer Gladys Mitchell. It is the eighteenth in her long-running series featuring the psychoanalyst and amateur detective Mrs Bradley. It has been described as one of the best of Mitchell's novels.

In 2000 it was adapted for an episode of the television series The Mrs Bradley Mysteries starring Diana Rigg.

Synopsis
The arrival of a travelling circus enlivens the life of a sleepy English village, particularly when one of the female tightrope walkers is found dead. The killing of a second victim, a barmaid, again when the moon is shining brightly suggests that there may be a lunatic at large.

References

Bibliography
 Hanson, Gillian Mary. City and Shore: The Function of Setting in the British Mystery. McFarland, 2015.
 Klein, Kathleen Gregory. Great Women Mystery Writers: Classic to Contemporary. Greenwood Press, 1994.
 Reilly, John M. Twentieth Century Crime & Mystery Writers. Springer, 2015.

1945 British novels
Novels by Gladys Mitchell
British crime novels
British mystery novels
British thriller novels
Novels set in England
British detective novels
Michael Joseph books
British novels adapted into television shows